Nalia Radio and Television (NRT) claims to be the first ever independent media network in the Kurdistan Region. The corporation claims to be independent, It was formed in 2010 by freelance journalists who launched the first ever independent media network, funded by Nalia company.

Shaswar Abdulwahid Qadir is the owner and founder of Nalia Media Corporation and is built under the slogan of ‘Courage, Balance and Truth.’ He is often accused of corruption and failed to pay the shareholders of Chavi Land in Sulaimaniyah province, a project that he owns.

In the first week of its launch (Feb 17, 2011), NRT TV was burned down to the ground, but it was rebuilt. On October 26, 2013 there was an assassination attempt on owner and founder of NRT, Shaswar Abdulwahid Qadir which he survived although injured in his leg. Subsequently four more TV channels were added to the group named NRT2, NRT3(kids), NRT4 and NRT Arabic.

It has its main office in Sulaymaniyah, Nalia Media Corporation (NMC) and also has offices in Erbil, Baghdad, Brussels, Paris, London, Washington, and Diyarbakir.

NMC consists of:

 NRT HD: A satellite news channel established in 2010 that broadcasts in Sorani and Badini Kurdish.
 NRT2: An arts and entertainment channel launched in 2012.
 NRT Arabic: A satellite news channel launched in 2016.
 NRT3 Kids: A satellite channel launched in 2019.
 NRT 4: A satellite religious channel launched in 2019.
 NRT Education: A satellite channel launched in 2020.
 NRT Digital Media: A division of NRT managing six websites and three mobile apps founded in 2011.
 Nalia FM: A radio station broadcasting music and news launched in 2010.
 Nalia Media Academy: A training institute focusing on media careers founded in 2015.
 Pam Media: A production company that produces advertisements for commercial products or services established in 2014.

References

 http://onlineradiobox.com/iq/nrtnaliafm/
 http://www.rudaw.net/mobile/english/kurdistan/250720176
 https://www.lyngsat.com/tvchannels/iq/NRT.html
 Avesta Group

External links

 

Television stations in Kurdistan Region (Iraq)
Television stations in Iraq
Kurdish-language television stations
Mass media in Sulaymaniyah
Television channels and stations established in 2010
2010 establishments in Iraqi Kurdistan